Vladimir Vasilievich Druzhnikov (30 May 1922 – 20 February 1994) was a Soviet actor. He appeared in more than 40 films between 1945 and 1992. He was a People's Artist of the RSFSR (1974) and the winner of two Stalin Prizes (1948, 1950).

Partial filmography

 Bez viny vinovatye (1945) - Grigoriy Neznamov
 The Stone Flower (1946) - Danilo - master
 The Great Glinka (1946) - Rileyev
 Nashe serdtse (1947) - Sergey Kazakov
 Ballad of Siberia (1948) - Andrei Nikolayevich Balashov
 Konstantin Zaslonov (1949) - Konstantin Zaslonov
 Zagovor obrechyonnykh (1950) - Mark Pino
 Zhukovsky (1950) - Nesterov
 The Miners of Donetsk (1951) - Trofimenko
 Admiral Ushakov (1953) - Midshipman Vasilyev
 Attack from the Sea (1953) - Capt. Vasilyev
 Chest tovarishcha (1953) - mayor Sergey Bokunov
 Opasnye tropy (1955) - Vasiliy Zholudev
 The Grasshopper (1955) - Ryabovsky
 Neobyknovennoye leto (1957)
 Pervye Radosti (1957) - Yegor Tsvetukhin
 Krutye stupeni (1957) - Yevgeniy Tarasovich Narezsnyy
 Lastochka (1958) - Yarnovsky
 Lyudi na mostu (1960) - Odintsov
 Duel (1961) - Von Koren
 Dve zhizni (1961) - Kirill Borozdin
 Generali da zizilebi (1963) - Dobrov
 The Three Sisters (1964) - Solyony
 The Hyperboloid of Engineer Garin (1965) - Arthur Levy / Volshin
 Artakarg handznararutyun (1966) - Neledetsky
 Desyatyy shag (1967)
 Net i da (1967) - Vorontsov
 Tainstvennyy monakh (1968) - Vorontsov
 Morskoy kharakter (1970) - Vasiliy Sergeyevich Filatov
 Waterloo (1970) - Gerard
 Officers (1971) - Georgiy Petrovich
 Chelovek v shtatskom (1973) - Stepan
 Bez prava na oshibku (1975) - Yuriy Petrovich - prokuror
 The Tavern on Pyatnitskaya (1978) - Volokhov
 U menya vsyo normalno (1978)
 Plata za istinu (1978) - Sechenov
 Life Is Beautiful (1979) - (voice)
 Ledyanaya vnuchka (1980)
 The Mystery of the Third Planet (1981) - (voice)
 Oni byli aktyorami (1981)
 Vertical Race (1982, TV Movie) - Alexey Y. Uvnarskiy, Surgeon
 Auktsion (1983) - Sergey Travnikov
 Probuzhdenie (1983) - Rukin
 Chelovek na polustanke (1983)
 Zhil otvazhnyy kapitan (1985)
 Bagrationi (1985)
 Tantsploshchadka (1986) - Ippolit Anatolyevich
 Private Detective, or Operation Cooperation (1990) - Passenger
 Glukhoman (1991)
 Back in the USSR (1992) - Priest
 Zhelaniye lyubvi (1993) - Doctor

References

External links

1922 births
1994 deaths
Soviet male film actors
People's Artists of the RSFSR
Stalin Prize winners
Russian male film actors
Soviet male voice actors
Burials in Troyekurovskoye Cemetery
Male actors from Moscow